The 2011 GCC U-23 Championship was the third edition of the GCC U-23 Championship. It took place in Doha, Qatar for the second time. Six nations took part. The competition was held in Doha from 12 to 21 August. Oman won their first title after defeating United Arab Emirates 4–2 on penalties in the final.

Teams
{| class="wikitable sortable"
|-
! Team
! data-sort-type="number"|Previous appearances in tournament
|-
|  || 2 (2008, 2010)
|-
|  || 2 (2008, 2010)
|-
|  (host) || 2 (2008, 2010)
|-
|   || 2 (2008, 2010)
|-
|  || 2 (2008, 2010)
|-
|   || 1 (2010)
|}

Venues

Group stage

Group A

Group B

Knockout stage
In the knockout stage, extra time and penalty shoot-out were be used to decide the winner if necessary (Regulations Articles 10.1 and 10.3).

Bracket

Fifth place play-off

Semi-finals

Third place play-off

Final

Winners

Awards
The following awards were given at the conclusion of the tournament:

Goalscorers

See also 
Arabian Gulf Cup
Arab Gulf Cup Football Federation

References

External links
GCC U-23 Championship at Goalzz

GCC U-23 Championship
2011
2011 in Asian football
2011–12 in Qatari football
2011–12 in Saudi Arabian football
2011–12 in Bahraini football
2011–12 in Omani football
2011–12 in Kuwaiti football
2011–12 in Emirati football
2011 in youth association football